Fontão is a river in Portugal.

Rivers of Portugal